The 2000 San Francisco Giants season was the Giants' 118th season in Major League Baseball and their 43rd season in San Francisco since their move from New York following the 1957 season.  The Giants finished in first place in the National League West with a record of 97 wins and 65 losses, which was the best record in the major leagues in 2000. They lost the National League Division Series in four games to the New York Mets. 
The team played their first season in newly opened Pacific Bell Park. The Giants had 889 runs batted in (RBI), the most in franchise history, while their 925 runs scored is the most in the club's San Francisco era.

Offseason
 December 12, 1999: Bobby Estalella was traded by the Philadelphia Phillies to the San Francisco Giants for Chris Brock.

Regular season

Opening Day starters

Season standings

Record vs. opponents

Transactions
June 5, 2000: Boof Bonser was drafted by the San Francisco Giants in the 1st round (21st pick) of the 2000 amateur draft. Player signed July 3, 2000.
July 3, 2000: Jalal Leach was signed as a free agent with the San Francisco Giants.

Roster

Pacific Bell Park
 The opening series took place from April 11–13, 2000 against the Los Angeles Dodgers (the same team the Giants faced in their final series at Candlestick Park), and the Giants were swept in three games. In the first game of that series, the Giants lost 6-5, highlighted by three home runs from the Dodgers' Kevin Elster.

Because of the proximity to the San Francisco Bay, the right field foul pole is only  from home plate. The wall is made of brick, with fenced off archways opening to the Cove beyond, above which are several rows of arcade seating. Atop the fence are four pillars with fountains atop. These four pillars will burst jets of water when a Giant hits a home run.

 Lining the foul portion of the wall are rubber chickens, which are put up by fans whenever a Giants player (especially Barry Bonds) is intentionally walked. The fans do this to show that the opposing team is "chicken" for not pitching right to the Giants players. To some old-timers, the right field area vaguely suggests the layout at the Polo Grounds. This deep corner of the ballpark has been dubbed "death valley" and "triples alley." Like its Polo Grounds counterpart, it is very difficult to hit a home run to this area, and a batted ball that finds its way into this corner often results in a triple.

 Beyond right field is a section of the bay, dubbed McCovey Cove after famed Giants first baseman Willie McCovey, into which a number of home runs have been hit on the fly. As of September 17, 2007, 45 "Splash Hits" had been knocked into the Cove by Giants players since the park opened; 35 of those were by Barry Bonds. Opponents had hit the water on the fly 15 times; Todd Hundley of the Los Angeles Dodgers was the first visitor to do so on June 30, 2000. Luis Gonzalez of the Los Angeles Dodgers and Cliff Floyd of the Chicago Cubs are the only visiting players to do so twice, while Carlos Delgado of the New York Mets has performed the feat three times. Across the cove from the ballpark is McCovey Point and China Basin Park, featuring monuments to past Giants legends.

Player stats

Batting
Note: Pos = Position; G = Games played; AB = At bats; H = Hits; Avg. = Batting average; HR = Home runs; RBI = Runs batted in

Other batters
Note: G = Games played; AB = At bats; H = Hits; Avg. = Batting average; HR = Home runs; RBI = Runs batted in

Starting pitchers
Note: G = Games; IP = Innings pitched: W = Wins; L = Losses; ERA = Earned run average; SO = Strikeouts

Other pitchers
Note: G = Games pitched; IP = Innings pitched; W = Wins; L = Losses; ERA = Earned run average; SO = Strikeouts

Relief pitchers
Note: G = Games: W = Wins: L = Losses; SV = Saves; ERA = Earned run average; SO = Strikeouts

National League Divisional Playoffs

San Francisco Giants vs. New York Mets
New York wins series, 3-1.

Award winners
 Ellis Burks, Outfield, Willie Mac Award
All-Star Game
Jeff Kent, second base, starter
Barry Bonds elected to start but unable to play de to injury
National League Most Valuable Player:
Jeff Kent, Second Base

Farm system

References

External links
 2000 San Francisco Giants team page at Baseball Reference
 2000 San Francisco Giants team page at Baseball Almanac

National League West champion seasons
San Francisco Giants seasons
San Francisco Giants Season, 2000
San Francisco Giants Season, 2000
2000 in San Francisco
San Fran